John Carmichael OAM (born 5 October 1930) is an Australian pianist, composer and music therapist who has long been resident in the United Kingdom.  One of his best known works is the Concierto folklorico for piano and string orchestra.  His works for piano form much of his musical output, although he composes for many other instruments.  His work is described as expressive and lyrical.

Biography
John Carmichael was born in Melbourne in 1930. He studied piano with Margaret Schofield and in 1947 won a scholarship to the Melbourne Conservatorium of Music, where his teacher was Raymond Lambert. He also studied composition with Dorian Le Gallienne. Moving to Europe, he studied at the Paris Conservatoire with Marcel Ciampi and in London with Arthur Benjamin and Anthony Milner, a pupil of Mátyás Seiber. He wrote the music for Britain's Festival of Women during this period. He also wrote reviews and critiques for music magazines.

John Carmichael was a pioneer in the field of music therapy; he developed music teaching and music appreciation projects at Stoke Mandeville Hospital and Netherden Mental Hospital in Surrey, and worked for the Council for Music Therapy in London.

Between 1958 and 1963, he was Music Director of the Spanish dance company Eduardo Y Navarra, during which time he became fascinated by Spanish folk idiom. He toured internationally with the group, including an Australian visit. From this came the Concierto folklorico for piano and string orchestra. John Carmichael has twice recorded this work with himself as soloist, both times with the West Australian Symphony Orchestra (1970, conducted by Tibor Paul; 1984, conducted by David Measham).

In 1980, his Phoenix Flute Concerto was premiered at the Sydney Opera House with James Galway as soloist and the Sydney Symphony Orchestra under Louis Frémaux. Galway also played in the U.S. premiere the same year, at the Hollywood Bowl by the Los Angeles Philharmonic under Michael Tilson Thomas.

In 1984, he appeared as soloist in a performance of his piano concerto on the "Last Night of the Proms" during the 10th Perth International Arts Festival.

Writing for the piano has always stimulated ideas for compositions has led to collaborations with Australian pianists such as Victor Sangiorgio, Antony Gray and also with Carles & Sofia piano duo, who have recorded Carmichael’s complete works for piano four hands for the label KNS-classical.

Honours
In the Queen's Birthday Honours of June 2011, John Carmichael was awarded the Medal of the Order of Australia (OAM) for his services as a composer and concert pianist.

Works
 Damon Suite (1946)
 Bagatelle (1956)
 Puppet Show (1958; piano duet)
 Tourbillon (piano 1959; piano four hands 2006)
 Fetes champetres (1960; clarinet and piano)
 Concierto folklorico (1965; piano and string orchestra)
 Country Fair (1972; clarinet and orchestra)
 Trumpet Concerto (1972)
 Thredbo Suite (1980; flute and piano, or flute and orchestra)
 Phoenix Concerto (1980; flute and orchestra)
 Fantasy Concerto (1988; flute and orchestra)
 Saxophone Concerto (1990)
 Latin American Suite (1990; Bahama Rumba, Habanera, Joropo)(piano 4 hands 2001: Bahama Rumba, Joropo, Habanera, Jongo)
 Bravura Waltzes (piano 1990; 4-hands 2003)
 From the Dark Side (1992; 1. The Secret Ceremony.  2. Before Nightfall.  3. Elegy.  4. Dance with the Devil)
 Dark Scenarios (piano four hands, 1994)
 Spider Song (1995)
 Sea Changes (2000; piano quartet)
 Sonatine (2001: Pastorale; Interlude; Toccata)
 Sun Worship, concert aria (2001; soprano, clarinet and piano)
 Serenade for flute and strings (2002)
 Fantasy Sonata (flute and piano)
 Aria and Finale (soprano saxophone and piano)
 Latin American Suite (alto saxophone and piano)
 Opera (libretto based on Jean Rhys)
 Piano Concerto No. 2 (premièred in 2011)
 A Little Night Music (suite for flute and piano: 1. Caribbean Moonrise; 2. Quiet Evening; 3. Carnival Night)
 On the Green (wind ensemble)
 Hommages – Manuel de Falla, Francis Poulenc, Gabriel Fauré, Maurice Ravel (piano and piano four hands, 2008)
 Troubled Dream (d’après Franz Liszt)
 Escapades (2009; Flute choir)

External links
 John Carmichael website
 amcoz
 NLA

References

Australian classical pianists
Male classical pianists
1930 births
Living people
20th-century classical composers
20th-century classical pianists
21st-century classical composers
21st-century classical pianists
Composers for piano
Music therapists
People educated at Haileybury (Melbourne)
Recipients of the Medal of the Order of Australia
Australian male classical composers
Australian classical composers
20th-century Australian male musicians
20th-century Australian musicians
21st-century Australian male musicians
21st-century Australian musicians